Jonah Gadjovich (born October 8, 1998) is a Canadian ice hockey left winger who plays for the San Jose Sharks of the National Hockey League (NHL). He was selected 55th overall in the 2017 NHL Entry Draft by the Vancouver Canucks.

Growing up in Whitby, Ontario, Gadjovich began playing minor ice hockey with the Whitby Wildcats of the Eastern AAA Hockey League. He was soon drafted by the Owen Sound Attack in the second round of the 2014 Ontario Hockey League (OHL) Priority Selection. Through his tenure with the Attack, Gadjovich accumulated 89 goals and 66 assists through 228 games played.

Early life
Gadjovich was born on October 8, 1998, in Whitby, Ontario. He was born into an athletic family as his uncles Blair and Tony MacDonald were active within the National Hockey League (NHL). Blair played 219 career NHL games with the Edmonton Oilers and Vancouver Canucks while Tony is the director of amateur scouting for the Carolina Hurricanes.

Playing career

Amateur
Growing up in Whitby, Ontario, Gadjovich began playing minor ice hockey with the Whitby Wildcats of the Eastern AAA Hockey League. While with the team, he competed for Team OMHA White at the Gold Cup in Kitchener where he tallied a goal and three assists in five games. During the  2013–14 season, he had tallied 15 goals and 15 assists before signing a standard player agreement with the Owen Sound Attack of the Ontario Hockey League (OHL). He had originally been drafted by the Attack in the second round, 39th overall, in the 2014 Ontario Hockey League Priority Selection. Following the signing, Gadjovich, and teammate Victor Mete were selected by Hockey Canada to participate in their 2014 National Under-17 Development Camp. He returned to the Attack for his rookie season and notched his first career OHL goal on October 5, 2014, in a 7–2 win over the Ottawa 67's. Gadjovich finished his rookie season with four goals and five assists for nine points through 60 games.

Gadjovich improved offensively in his first year of draft eligibility and finished the 2016–17 season with 46 goals through 60 games. His first career OHL hat-trick came on January 7, 2017, in a 5–1 win over the Windsor Spitfires to lead the Attack to their ninth consecutive win. He scored his second hat-trick of the season two games later to help set an Attack franchise record with 11th consecutive wins. On February 11, Gadjovich tallied his third OHL hat-trick in a 10–5 win over the Ottawa 67's to lead the Attack to their eighth win in 10 games. During a game against the London Knights, Gadjovich recorded his fourth hat-trick of the season to help the team qualify for the 2017 Ontario Hockey League Playoffs. During the game, he was cross-checked by Max Jones who was subsequently suspended for 10 games. At the conclusion of the season, Gadjovich was selected for the OHL Second All-Star Team. As the 2017 NHL Entry Draft approached, Gadjovich was given a final ranking of 39th amongst North American skaters by the NHL Central Scouting Bureau. He had originally been ranked 60th overall in November but his breakout season earned him a jump in the standings.

Gadjovich was eventually drafted in the second round, 55th overall, by the Vancouver Canucks after they acquired the pick from the Columbus Blue Jackets as compensation for the Blue Jackets hiring John Tortorella. He returned to the Attack for the 2017–18 season where he played eight games before signing an entry-level contract with the Canucks.

Professional

Vancouver Canucks
Gadjovich concluded his major junior ice hockey career at end of the 2017–18 season and joined the Canucks American Hockey League (AHL) affiliate, the Utica Comets, for the 2018–19 season. However, he did not compete in the Canucks' Summer Showcase game at Rogers Arena as he was recovering from a wrist injury suffered during the OHL playoffs. He made his professional debut on October 5, 2018, in the Comets' season opener against the Toronto Marlies. He later scored his first professional goal on November 9 in a 4–3 shootout win over the Hartford Wolf Pack to lead the team to a 5–3–1 record. As Gadjovich continued to display his offensive prowess, Comets coach Trent Cull gave him time on the Comets' power play as a replacement for Zack MacEwen. He finished his first professional season with four goals and 10 points through 40 games.

Following his rookie season, Gadjovich was invited to participate in the Canucks development camp prior to the 2019–20 season. However, he was subsequently re-assigned to the Comets prior to the start of the season. By December, Gadjovich had surpassed his previous season's goal total with five goals through 12 games. Due to various injuries and illness throughout the shortened season, Gadjovich was held to only 38 games but he still set career-highs with 13 goals and four assists for 17 points along with 32 penalty minutes.

Gadjovich continued to produce and score goals in his third professional season. In May, he led the Comets with 15 goals and earned his first career NHL call-up after recording a Gordie Howe hat trick. Gadjovich subsequently made his NHL debut on May 17, 2021, against the Calgary Flames, where he played 4:55 in the 6–5 overtime loss. As a result of his overall play during the season, Gadjovich was voted the Comets' Most Valuable Player, which is voted on by media members, and the Tom McVie Award for the coach’s most valuable player.

San Jose Sharks
On October 7, 2021, Gadjovich was claimed off waivers by the San Jose Sharks. Upon claiming him, Sharks general manager Doug Wilson praised him as a "skater who can use his size to his advantage." Gadjovich was subsequently named to their NHL roster and made his debut against the Boston Bruins on October 24, 2021. During that game, he tallied his first NHL point, an assist, on Jasper Weatherby's goal in an eventual 4–3 loss to the Bruins. His first goal came on February 27, 2022, in a 3–1 victory over the Seattle Kraken. He re-signed to a one-year contract on August 29, 2022.

International play

Gadjovich was selected to the Team Canada's under-20 team for the 2018 World Junior Championships in Buffalo, New York, winning gold. He was named a player of the game for scoring two goals against Slovakia.

Career statistics

Regular season and playoffs

International

Awards and honours

References

External links

1998 births
Canadian ice hockey left wingers
Living people
Ice hockey people from Ontario
Owen Sound Attack players
People from Whitby, Ontario
San Jose Sharks players
Sportspeople from Whitby, Ontario
Canadian people of Macedonian descent
Utica Comets players
Vancouver Canucks draft picks
Vancouver Canucks players